The Memento Mori World Tour is an upcoming worldwide concert tour by English electronic music band Depeche Mode in support of the group's 15th studio album, Memento Mori. The tour is set to commence on 23 March 2023. This will be the first concert tour to not feature keyboardist Andy Fletcher.

The tour was first announced on 4 October 2022, along with the Memento Mori album announcement at an event in Berlin. A third leg of the tour for North America was announced on 16 February 2023, with 34 additional shows.

Shows

Musicians

Depeche Mode
Dave Gahan – lead vocals
Martin Gore – guitar, keyboards, lead and backing vocals

References

2023 concert tours
Depeche Mode concert tours